The Traer Star-Clipper was the weekly newspaper of Traer, Iowa. It published on Fridays and has a circulation of roughly 2,500. 

In May 2020, it merged with Dysart (Iowa) Reporter to create the North Tama Telegraph.

History
The newspaper was founded in 1876.

The paper primarily served the community of Traer, but also provided news and sports coverage of neighboring communities in Tama County, Iowa. The small towns of Dysart, Buckingham, and Clutier were included in this coverage area, along with the local school district, North Tama.

The publication was the result of a merger between the Traer Star and the Traer Clipper. From 1894 until 1953, the paper was published at Traer's famous "Winding Stairs" building, which is now owned and maintained by the Traer Historical Museum. The small editorial and bookkeeping staff have maintained the office in a building one block east of the Winding Stairs since 1953.

References

External links
Traer Star-Clipper website

Defunct newspapers published in Iowa
Newspapers established in 1876
1876 establishments in Iowa
2020 disestablishments in Iowa